The 2004 Tranzam Sports Sedan Series was an Australian motor racing competition open to Sports Sedans and Trans Am type cars. The series was administered by the National Australian Sports Sedan Association and was sanctioned by CAMS as a National Series. Held as the first Tranzam Sports Sedan Series following the discontinuation of the Australian Sports Sedan Championship at the end of 2003, it was won by Darren Hossack driving a Saab 9-3.

Calendar
The series was contested over five rounds with three races per round.

Eligible cars
The following cars were eligible to compete in the series:
 Class SS: Space framed Sports Sedans complying with CAMS Group 3D Sports Sedan regulations
 Class TS: Transam cars complying with regulations for North American Transam competition
 Class TZ: TraNZam cars complying with the relevant New Zealand regulations
 Class TA: Australian TA cars complying with National Australian Sports Sedan Association Class TA regulations

Points system
Series points were awarded in each race according to the following criteria:

In addition, 2 points were awarded for first place in qualifying.

Series standings

The above table lists only the top three placegetters.

References

External links
 Images of Hossack's Saab 9-3 and Ricciardello's Alfa Romeo GTV competing at Oran Park, www.saabcentral.com via web.archive.org

National Sports Sedan Series
Tranzam Sports Sedan Series